Mohamed Ben Saleh (born January 1, 1981) is a former Libyan judoka.

Major results

References

External links 

1981 births
Living people
Libyan male judoka
Judoka at the 2004 Summer Olympics
Judoka at the 2008 Summer Olympics
Olympic judoka of Libya
African Games bronze medalists for Libya
African Games medalists in judo
Competitors at the 2007 All-Africa Games